Jet fighter generations classify the major technology leaps in the historical development of the jet fighter. Different authorities have identified different technology jumps as the key ones, dividing fighter development into different numbers of generations. Five generations are now widely recognised, with the development of a sixth under way.

Classification
In 1990, air historian Richard P. Hallion proposed a classification of jet fighters into six generations up to that time. Other schemes comprising five generations up to around the same period have since been described, although the demarcation lines between generations differ. Taylor and Guilmartin name four; subsonic, transonic, supersonic and Mach 2, and add a fifth "new" generation with multimission capability and culminating in types such as the F-16 and MiG-29. A NASA web publication divides jet development into five stages; pioneer (straight wing), swept wing, transonic, the 1960s and 1970s on, culminating in types such as the F-15, F-16 and AV-8A.

In the 1990s, a different division came into use in Russia, where a "fifth generation" fighter was proposed as a counter to the Lockheed Martin F-22 Raptor. In contrast, a preceding fourth generation filled in the gap since the F-15/16 era. This effectively condensed the previous classifications to three generations. In 2004, Aerospaceweb listed one such division into five generations. Although details differ, the basic classification into five generations has since been widely adopted.

The exact criteria for the various generation steps are not universally agreed on and are subject to some controversy. For example, Lockheed Martin has applied the term "fifth generation" to its F-22 and F-35 aircraft, but this has been challenged by its competitors Eurofighter GmbH and Boeing IDS. It has been suggested that Lockheed Martin "labeled the F-35 a 'fifth-generation' fighter in 2005, a term it borrowed from Russia in 2004 to describe the F-22", or that the post–Cold War era, low-cost approach of the Saab Gripen should qualify it as a sixth generation jet. Some accounts have subdivided the 4th generation into 4 and 4.5, or 4+ and 4++.

The table below shows how some authors have divided up the generations, progressively since 1990. 

Five generations are now commonly recognized, with the fifth representing the latest generation in service (as of 2012).

Future types at an early stage of development are expected to have even further enhanced capabilities and have become known as a sixth generation.

The rest of this article broadly follows the analysis of Baker.

First generation (1940s)  

The earliest jet fighters appeared during and after the last years of World War II. They were similar in most respects to their piston-engined contemporaries, having straight, unswept wings and being of wood and/or light alloy construction. (The Me 262 had a lightly swept wing, but this was done principally to achieve balance, and the sweep was deliberately kept too little to have a significant aerodynamic effect.) They had little or no avionics, with their primary armament being manually-controlled guns. The Heinkel He 162 and Gloster Meteor also saw wartime service, while types such as the de Havilland Vampire and Lockheed F-80 were still working up to operational service when the war ended.

The introduction of the swept wing allowed transonic speeds to be reached, but controllability was often limited at such speeds. These aircraft were typically aimed at the air-superiority interceptor role. Notable types which took part in the Korean War of 1950-53 include the Soviet Mikoyan-Gurevich MiG-15 and the North American F-86 Sabre. The Hawker Hunter appeared too late for the war but was widely used and took part in several later ones.

Second generation (1950s)  

The Korean War of 1950-1953 forced a major rethink. Guns proved unsuitable at such high speeds, while the need for multirole capability in battlefield support was rediscovered. Interceptor types emerging after the war used after-burning engines to give Mach 2 performance, while radar and infrared homing missiles greatly improved their accuracy and firepower. The American Century series such as the Lockheed F-104 Starfighter, as well as the Russian MiG-21, English Electric Lightning and French Dassault Mirage III were typical of this era. Many types were soon compromised by adaptations for battlefield support roles, and some of these would persist in new variants for multiple generations.

Third generation (1960s)  

The next generation of fighters were designed from the start to be multi-role. They were expected to carry a wide range of weapons and other ordnance, such as air-to-ground missiles and laser-guided bombs, while also being able to engage in air-to-air interception beyond visual range. Their supporting avionics included pulse-doppler radar, off-sight targeting and terrain-warning systems.

The advent of more economical turbofan engines brought extended range and sortie times, while increased thrust could only partly deliver better performance and manoeuvrability across the speed range. Some designers resorted to variable geometry or vectored thrust in an attempt to reconcile these opposites. Types such as the McDonnell Douglas F-4 Phantom, General Dynamics F-111, Mikoyan-Gurevich MiG-23, Sukhoi Su-17, Shenyang J-8, and Hawker Siddeley Harrier had varying degrees of success.

Fourth generation (1970s) 

Following the mixed successes of the multirole generation, advanced technologies were being developed, such as fly-by-wire, composite materials, thrust-to-weight ratios greater than unity, hypermaneuverability, advanced digital avionics and sensors such as synthetic radar and infrared search-and-track, and stealth. As these appeared piecemeal, designers returned to the fighter first and foremost, but with support, roles mapped out as anticipated developments. The General Dynamics F-16 introduced electronic flight control and wing-body blending, while the Saab 37 Viggen broke new ground in aerodynamic configuration with its canard foreplanes. The Anglo-American Harrier II and Soviet Sukhoi Su-27 highlighted extreme manoeuvrability with, respectively, strengthened exhaust nozzles for viffing (vectoring in forward flight) and manoeuvring control at high angles of attack as in Pugachev's Cobra. The Panavia Tornado remained multi-role and developed a defensive/offensive sensor, avionics and weapons suite especially capable of anti-radar and anti-missile ground attack, while the Lockheed F-117 introduced stealth as a design concept. Chinese People's Liberation Army (PLA), with a different generation system, classifies most fourth-generation fighters as the third generation.

4.5 generation (1990s)
Later variants of these and other aircraft progressively enhanced their characteristic technologies and increasingly incorporated aspects of each other's, as well as adopting some emerging fifth-generation technologies such as:

 Active electronically scanned array radar
 Low-probability-of-intercept radar
 Electro-optical targeting systems
 Sensor fusion
 Supercruise
 Link 16 like, high-capacity digital network communications
 use of composite materials to reduce the Radar cross-section
 
These partial upgrades to 5th generation capability have led some commentators to identify intermediate generations as 4.5 or 4+ and 4++. In some cases, such as the Mikoyan-Gurevich MiG-35 developed from the MiG-29 with fifth-generation avionics, the upgrade has been classed as fully fifth generation. Many of these types remain in frontline service in 2022.

A number of new 4.5 generation types are being developed in the 2020s, post the emergence of the true 5th generation and contemporaneous with 6th generation aircraft development, these include the HAL Tejas MK 1A, CAC/PAC JF-17 Thunder Block 3, and KAI KF-21 Boramae.

Fifth generation (2000s)

The huge advance of digital computation and mobile networking, which began in the 1990s, led to a new model of sophisticated forward C3 (command, control and communications) presence above the battlefield. Such aircraft had previously been large transport types adapted for the role, but information technology had advanced to the point that a much smaller and more agile plane could now carry the necessary data systems. Sophisticated automation and human interfaces could greatly reduce crew workload. It was now possible to combine the C3, fighter and ground support roles in a single, agile aircraft. Such a fighter—and its pilot—would need to be able to loiter for long periods, hold its own in combat, maintain battlefield awareness and seamlessly switch roles as the situation developed.

Parallel advances in materials, engine technology and electronics made such a machine possible. From the start of the new millennium, advanced systems concepts such as smart helmets, sensor/data fusion and subsidiary attack drones were becoming realities. Bringing together and integrating such advances, along with those of the fourth generation, created what has become known as the fifth generation of fighters. The first of these is generally acknowledged to be the Lockheed Martin F-22. Subsequent types include the Lockheed Martin F-35, Chengdu J-20, and Sukhoi Su-57.

Sixth generation (2020s) 

With the fifth generation slowly coming into service, attention turned to a replacement sixth generation. The requirements for such a fighter remain under debate. Fifth-generation abilities for battlefield survivability, air superiority and ground support are being enhanced and adapted to the future threat environment. Development time and cost are proving major factors in laying out practical roadmaps. Drones and other remote unmanned technologies are being increasingly deployed on the battlefields of the new millennium. They may be integrated with sixth-generation fighter avionics, either as satellite aircraft under a sixth-generation command fighter or even replacing the pilot in an autonomous or semi-autonomous command aircraft. Studies such as the US Next Generation Air Dominance (NGAD) and F/A-XX programs, UK-led BAE Systems Tempest, and Chinese development work are ongoing. Specific requirements are anticipated by some observers to crystallize around 2025.

See also
 Northrop Grumman B-21 Raider: US 6th generation bomber project.

References

Citations

Bibliography
David Baker; Fifth Generation Fighters, Mortons, 2018.